Alan Cooperman is director of religion research at the Pew Research Center.

According to Pew Research Center, he is considered an expert on religion's role and statistics in the United States politics and he has also reported on religion in Russia, the Middle East and Europe.

References

Living people
Year of birth missing (living people)
Place of birth missing (living people)
American religion academics